Maskanah also spelled, Meskene is a town in northern Syria, administratively part of the Manbij District of the Aleppo Governorate. Nearby localities include Dayr Hafir, Humaymah Kabirah and Tell Ayoub to the northwest and al-Thawrah to the southeast. According to the Syria Central Bureau of Statistics (CBS), Maskanah had a population of 15,477 in the 2004 census. The Syrian government took control of Maskanah on 3 June 2017.

History
The Bronze Age city of Emar lies a few kilometres north of the present town. The earliest mention of Maskanah comes through Stephanus of Byzantium where it is mentioned in the context of Septimius Severus's campaigns against the Parthian Empire.

After the Muslim conquest of Syria, the town was overshadowed by the nearby Balis. The region was under the lordship of the rulers of Aleppo until the 12th century when the Atabegs of Mosul started asserting more control. The area was devastated by the Mongol invasions in the 13th and 14th centuries. In 1210, during Ayyubid rule, the al-Adil Minaret was constructed. The brick structure was built in the simple, Persian architectural style. It was restored during Hafez al-Assad's rule (1970-2000) and is one last historic architectural remains in the town.

During Ottoman times, the area was mostly inhabited by nomadic tribes. In 1838 Maskanah was classified as a ruined village ("khirba") by Biblical scholar Eli Smith. The cultivable lands of the Aleppo Vilayet, including Maskanah, were confiscated in 1876 by Sultan Abdulhamid II as his own personal property. The lands were later integrated back into the state as public property. In 1915 the town was visited by orientalist Alois Musil who mentions the town having barracks, a large khan, and the residence of the head of the telegraph service. A year later, Maskanah became a major deportation route during the Armenian genocide where an estimated 80,000 Armenians died.

Under the French mandate, the town was the center of a qadaa, and served as a center for milk production and cattle merchants. In 1945 the village had 430 inhabitants.

On 3 June 2017, the city was captured by the Syrian Armed Forces from ISIL.

Tribes
The pre-Islamic Hadidin tribe is attested in the region of Maskanah through a tomb of Shaykh Hadid, a venerated ancestor of the tribe. After the Muslim conquest, the area was continuously inhabited by the Anizzah and Banu Bakr tribes. The 17th and 18th centuries saw another wave of migration to the area by the Anizzah. Nowadays, the region is mostly composed of the Anizzah and Shammar tribes.

Geography
The town lies on the left bank of the Euphrates in an area where the river bends eastwards due to a Pleistocene terrace. The town's distance to the river has varied over the years due to changes in the river's bed. Maskanah lies on the border between the Syrian Desert to the south, and the northern fertile Manbij Plain.

References

Notes

Bibliography

Populated places in Manbij District
Towns in Aleppo Governorate